Gagan Khoda  (born 24 October 1974) is a former Indian cricketer. He played two One Day Internationals in 1998. Despite scoring 89 runs in one of those two innings, he never made it to the Indian team after those two matches.He is from Meena community.

He has been given due recognition now after his appointment as a National Selector by the BCCI on 9 November 2015, representing the Central Zone in the Selection Committee. Now has two children called aaryaman Khoda and aaryaveer Khoda.

Domestic career
In domestic cricket, he represented Rajasthan cricket team and Central Zone cricket team. Khoda, enjoyed an outstanding junior career before making a century on debut in the Ranji Trophy in 1991–92. A score of 237 in the Ranji quarter-final in 1994–95 further established him as a promising youngster. Now he has two son called Aaryaveer and Aaryaman .

Now actively retired from cricket, Gagan focuses his time and energy on running an outlet of India's largest laundry and dry-cleaning chain, UClean.

International career
He represented India in two One Day Internationals and scored 89 against Kenya and was Man of the Match. He scored 26 against Bangladesh in Coca-Cola tri-series 1997/98. He was one of the new openers that India had tried out. He also played in the 1998 Commonwealth Games in Malaysia, without much impact.

References

External links
 

1974 births
Cricketers at the 1998 Commonwealth Games
India One Day International cricketers
Indian cricketers
Living people
Rajasthan cricketers
Central Zone cricketers
India national cricket team selectors
Commonwealth Games competitors for India